
Gmina Łęczyce is a rural gmina (administrative district) in Wejherowo County, Pomeranian Voivodeship, in northern Poland.

Villages
Gmina Łęczyce contains the villages and settlements of Borówko, Bożepole Małe, Bożepole Wielkie, Brzeźno Lęborskie, Chmieleniec, Chrzanowo, Dąbrówka Brzezińska, Dąbrówka Wielka, Dzięcielec, Godętowo, Jeżewo, Kaczkowo, Kisewo, Łęczyce, Łęczyn, Łówcz Górny, Mokry Bór, Nawcz, Nowy Dwór, Paraszyno, Pużyce, Redystowo, Rozłazinko, Rozłazino, Strzebielino, Strzebielino-Wieś, Strzelęcino, Świchowo, Świetlino, Węgornia, Wielistowo, Witków and Wysokie.

Neighbouring gminas
Gmina Łęczyce is bordered by the gminas of Cewice, Choczewo, Gniewino, Linia, Luzino and Nowa Wieś Lęborska.

References
Polish official population figures 2006

Leczyce
Wejherowo County